Amy Kwok (born September 26, 1967) is a former Miss Hong Kong (1991) winner and actress based in Hong Kong.

Education 
Kwok earned a degree in Electrical Engineering from California State University. Kwok earned a master's degree in Mechanical Engineering from University of Southern California.

Career 
In 1985, Kwok became an actress in Hong Kong film. Kwok first appeared as Cindy in The Island, a Horror Drama film directed by Po-Chih Leong.

In 1991, Kwok won the Miss Hong Kong beauty pageant.

Filmography

Films 
 1985 The Island - Cindy
 1992 The Greed of Man - Lung Kei-Man
 1993 Ambition
 1993 Fong Sai-yuk II - Princess
 1994 Let's Go Slam Dunk - Ah Shun	
 1994 A Gleam of Hope - Lu Yuen May
 1999 Victim - Amy Fu

Television series 
No Turning Back (2006)
Legend of Fang De and Miau Cui Hua (2006)
To Love with No Regrets (2004)
True Love (2003)
The Trust of a Life Time (2002)
Divine Retribution (2000)
 Justice Sung II (1999)
 Secret of the Heart (1998)
 Justice Sung (1997)
 ICAC Investigators 1996 (1996)
 Detective Investigation Files II (1995)
 A Good Match from Heaven (1995)
 Instinct (1994)
 Conscience (1994)
Ambition (1993)
 The Art of Being Together (1993)
 Heroes from Shaolin (1993)
 The Link (1993)
 The Greed of Man (1992)

Personal life 
Kwok's husband is Sean Lau, an actor.

References

External links 
 
 Wai Yin Association
 Amy Kwok Oi-Ming at hkmdb.com
 Amy Kwok at allmovie.com

Living people
1967 births
Hong Kong television actresses
20th-century Hong Kong actresses
21st-century Hong Kong actresses
Miss Hong Kong winners